Scuderia Corsa is an American automotive racing team with teams competing in the IMSA SportsCar Championship, Pirelli World Challenge and Ferrari Challenge in North America. Founded in 2012 by Giacomo Mattioli and Art Zafiropoulo, the team has the main purpose of supporting the racing needs of Ferrari clients, starting from customizable track-day events to the Ferrari Challenge Series to the most prestigious GT endurance racing such as the legendary 24 Hours of Le Mans.  Scuderia Corsa is the racing arm of Mattioli Automotive Group, inclusive of Ferrari Beverly Hills, Ferrari Silicon Valley, Ferrari South Bay and Ferrari Westlake.

History

IMSA Championship

In 2012, Scuderia Corsa started competing at the Grand-Am Rolex Sports Car Series at Mazda Raceway Laguna Seca in the no. 63 Ferrari 458 Italia securing pole position in its very first appearance with Alessandro Balzan. The second and final race of the season for Scuderia Corsa in 2012 was at Lime Rock Park with Alessandro Balzan and Johannes van Overbeek helping Ferrari win the GT manufacturer title for the 2012 Grand-Am Rolex Sports Car Series.

In 2013, Scuderia Corsa campaigned the no.63 Ferrari 458 Italia GT for the entire Grand-Am Rolex Sports Car Series season in the GT Class, with  starting drivers line-up consisting of Alessandro Balzan and Jeff Westphal. Scuderia Corsa won the Grand-Am Rolex GT Team and Driver Championship and helped Ferrari earn the manufacturer championship for the second year in a row in Lime Rock; a race that ended with a double podium (P2-P3) for the no. 63 and no. 64 Scuderia Corsa 458 Italia. That season, Scuderia Corsa earned 6 podiums and one win, at Kansas Speedway.

In 2014, Scuderia Corsa continued to run the no. 63 Ferrari 458 Italia in the GT-Daytona class of the IMSA SportsCar Championship clinching wins at the Brickyard Grand Prix and the Detroit Grand Prix and securing three podiums. The no. 63 Scuderia Corsa Ferrari 458 Italia achieved a top-ten finish in the GT-Daytona class in 2014 IMSA United SportsCar Championship.

In 2015, Scuderia Corsa won its second IMSA Championship in the GT-Daytona class with the no. 63 Ferrari 458 Italia with drivers Townsend Bell and Bill Sweedler, also securing the Ferrari GT-Daytona Manufacturer Championship and Tequila Patron North American Endurance Cup Manufacturers Championship. Scuderia Corsa also won at Virginia International Raceway.

In 2016 Scuderia Corsa won its third IMSA SportsCar Championship title in four years of professional motorsports with the no. 63 Ferrari 488 GT3, achieving Team and Drivers Championship Titles and the Tequila Patron North American Endurance Cup Drivers Title in the GT-Daytona class.  With the inaugural year of the no. 63 Ferrari 488 GT3, the team raced to victory at the 12 Hours of Sebring and 6 Hours of Watkins Glen with drivers Christina Nielsen, Alessandro Balzan and Jeff Segal.

In 2016, Scuderia Corsa also raced the no. 68 Ferrari 488 GTE in the IMSA Championship races of the North American Endurance Cup in the GT-Le Mans class with drivers Alessandro Pier Guidi and Daniel Serra, achieving pole and second place in GT-Le Mans at Mazda Raceway Laguna Seca and top 10th in the IMSA GT-Le Mans Championship.

In 2017 Scuderia Corsa won its fourth championship in five years with the 2017 IMSA WeatherTech Sports Card Team, Drivers, and Manufacturers Championship in the GT-Daytona.

24 Hours of Le Mans

In 2015, Scuderia Corsa debuted in the legendary 24 Hours of Le Mans entering the no. 62 Ferrari 458 in the GTE-Am class with drivers Townsend Bell, Bill Sweedler and Jeff Segal. Scuderia Corsa finished third in the GTE-Am class for the team's first 24 Hours of Le Mans.

In 2016, Scuderia Corsa re-entered the no. 62 Ferrari 458 Italia at the 84th 24 Hours of Le Mans driven again by the all-American lineup of Townsend Bell, Bill Sweedler and Jeff Segal. The team won in GTE-Am class, their second time entry at the 24 Hours of Le Mans.

In 2017, Scuderia Corsa entered the no. 62 Ferrari 488 GTE at the 84th 24 Hours of Le Mans driven again by the all-American lineup of Townsend Bell, Bill Sweedler and the addition of Cooper MacNeil. The team also entered a second entry driven by Alessandro Balzan, Christina Nielsen and Bret Curtis.

Pirelli World Challenge

Scuderia Corsa made its debut in the Pirelli World Challenge for the 2015 season with driver Martin Fuentes in the no. 07 Hublot Ferrari 458 Italia, Duncan Ende in the no. 64 Ferrari 458 Italia and Mike Hedlund in the no. 65 Ferrari 458 Italia. The team scored one win and 4 podiums during the 2015 season.

In 2016, Scuderia Corsa fielded the no. 07 Hublot Ferrari 458 Italia GT with driver Martin Fuentes and won the Pirelli World Challenge Championship in GT-A Class. With the team's ninth consecutive win during the 2016 season, Scuderia Corsa and Fuentes set a new Pirelli World Challenge record for victories in a season across all of the non-spec classes. Scuderia Corsa scored 9 wins and 7 additional podiums during the 2016 season. The team also earned the 2016 Special GT Crew Award of the Year, a special recognition voted by all Pirelli World Challenge teams in the paddock.

Ferrari Challenge

Scuderia Corsa currently competes in the Ferrari Challenge North America series. The Ferrari Challenge North American Championship, a Ferrari only motorsport championship, is organized by Ferrari North America and sanctioned by IMSA. The Ferrari Challenge series gives the most passionate Ferrari owners an exclusive opportunity to compete on a racing circuit in a global motorsport championship series.

Scuderia Corsa placed 3rd in the Ferrari North American Team Challenge for the 2010 Ferrari Challenge season.

In 2011, the team achieved 1st and 2nd place in the Ferrari Challenge North American Championship with the Ferrari Challenge F430.

In 2014, Scuderia Corsa won the Ferrari Challenge North American Championship with the Ferrari 458 Challenge EVO in the Coppa Shell class. Scuderia Corsa also placed 3rd at the Ferrari World Finals, with a total of 10 victories and 22 podiums throughout the 2014 season.

2016 proved to be an exciting year for Scuderia Corsa racing in the Ferrari Challenge North American Championship. The team scored 13 podiums throughout the season, placed 2nd in the Ferrari Challenge Championships in North America and 2nd also in the Ferrari Challenge World Finals.

In 2017, Scuderia Corsa ran the largest Ferrari Challenge team in the world with 15 drivers. They won the Ferrari Challenge North American Coppa Shell Championship.

Scuderia Corsa also initiated the Drivers Development Program, which provides a complete solution for drivers to looking to get on the racetrack for the first time. This program prepares early-stage drivers for participation in the Ferrari Challenge Esperienza Program, providing drivers with valuable track time and feedback from the team's engineering team and driver coaches.

Indycar

In 2018, Scuderia Corsa entered the Indianapolis 500 for the first time with veteran Indycar driver Oriol Servia in a Honda-powered effort fielded in conjunction with Rahal Letterman Lanigan Racing.

Racing Record
Ferrari Challenge North America

IMSA SportsCar Championship series results

24 Hours of Le Mans results

IndyCar Series
(key)

* Season still in progress

References

External links
Scuderia Corsa

American auto racing teams
24 Hours of Le Mans teams
Grand American Road Racing Association teams
WeatherTech SportsCar Championship teams
IndyCar Series teams